Squalius peloponensis, the Peloponnese chub, is a species of freshwater fish in the family Cyprinidae, growing to  SL.
It is found only in Greece. Its natural habitats are rivers, intermittent rivers, and freshwater lakes. It is threatened by habitat loss.

References 

Squalius
Endemic fauna of Greece
Freshwater fish of Europe
Fish described in 1844
Taxonomy articles created by Polbot